Sufiyana Pyaar Mera was an Indian television series broadcast on Star Bharat. It starred Helly Shah and Rajveer Singh.

Plot
Zaroon Shah, an NRI reached India to meet Kaynaat Shah to fulfill his father's wish though he himself is unwilling. When he arrives, he spots and falls in love with Kaynaat's look alike cousin Saltanat at first sight.

Upon seeing Kaynaat, Zaroon is confused on seeing their difference. Orthodox, Kaynaat lived and dressed in a traditional and conservative manner. Free spirited modern, Saltanat lived on her own terms and conditions.

Zaroon refuses to marry Kaynaat. Saltanat falls in love with him too. They decide to get married. Kaynaat plots against Saltanat hoping to keep them apart but fails. Soon, Saltanat discovers her conspiracies.

Her mother Zehnab reveals to her that Kaynaat is her twin sister not cousin and convinces her to not expose Kaynaat. Zaroon and Saltanat get married. Kaynaat does several attempts to take her place, but fails.

Madhav Sharma wants revenge from Kaynaat as 12 years back, she killed his sister Sakshi for having an affair with Kaynaat's father Khasaan; Zehnab helped her cover up the murder. Eventually, Kaynaat's truth is exposed.

Zaroon and Madhav join hands to fight against Kaynaat. Madhav starts falling for Saltanat, who lost her memory but regains it. She and Zaroon unite. Madhav goes to Delhi with his son Krish and promises to write to Saltanat every day.

20 years later
Grown up, Krish resembles Madhav and reads his diary, where he confessed that he wrote letters to Saltanat every day but could never post them due to his one-sided love for her.

Krish goes to a dargah and prays. He meets Saltanat and Zaroon's daughter Shaira Shah. They share a smile. The show ends with new beginning of Shaira and Krish's story.

Cast

Main
 Helly Shah as Saltanat Shah – Zehnab's daughter; Rubina and Nadeem's adopted daughter; Kaynaat's twin sister; Zaroon, Humza and Neelam's cousin; Zaroon's wife; Shaira's mother
 Rajveer Singh as Zaroon Shah Khan – Ghazala and Mamoon's son; Kaynaat, Saltanat, Humza and Neelam's cousin; Saltanat's husband; Shaira's father 
 Helly Shah / Pallavi Gupta as Kaynaat Shah – Zehnab's daughter; Saltanat's twin sister; Zaroon, Humza and Neelam's cousin; Zaroon's obsessive lover
 Vijayendra Kumeria as Madhav Kumar Sharma – Indu's son; Sakshi and Sneha's brother; Rupali's husband; Krish's father
 Helly Shah as Shaira Shah Khan – Saltanat and Zaroon's daughter; Krish's lover
 Vijayendra Kumeria as Krish Sharma – Rupali and Madhav's son; Shaira's lover
 Tanver Zaid as young Krish Sharma

Recurring
 Ram Gopal Bajaj as Sayyed Shehriyat "Miajaan" Shah Ghazi – Razia, Nadeem and Zulfar's father; Mamoon's uncle; Saltanat, Kaynaat, Humza and Neelam's grandfather; Zaroon's grand-uncle
 Melanie Nazareth as Zehnab Ashraf – Zulfar's widow; Saltanat and Kaynaat's mother; Humza, Neelam and Zaroon's aunt; Zaroon's mother-in-law; Shaira's grandmother 
 as Rubina Malik – Nadeem's wife; Kaynaat, Saltanat, Zaroon, Humza and Neelam's aunt; Saltanat's adoptive mother
 Jaineeraj Purohit as Nadeem Shah – Miajaan's son; Rubina's husband; Kaynaat, Saltanat, Zaroon, Humza and Neelam's uncle; Saltanat's adoptive father
 Anand Suryavanshi as Mamoon Shah – Razia, Nadeem and Zulfar's cousin; Ghazala's husband; Zaroon's father; Kaynaat, Saltanat, Humza and Neelam's uncle; Saltanat's father-in-law; Shaira's grandfather
 Kashish Duggal Paul as Ghazala – Mamoon's wife; Zaroon's mother; Kaynaat, Saltanat, Humza and Neelam's aunt; Saltanat's mother-in-law; Shaira's grandmother
 Saanvi Talwar as Rupali – Madhav's wife; Krish's mother
 Bidita Ghosh Sharma as Indu Sharma – Madhav, Sakshi and Sneha's mother; Krish's grandmother
 Nikunj Malik as Sabrina Ashraf – Zehnab's sister; Kaynaat and Saltanat's aunt
 Zaara Khan as Neelam Shah Abdalli – Razia and Junaid's daughter; Saltanat, Kaynaat and Zaroon's cousin; Humza's sister
 Kunal Khosla as Ayub Mohammed – Neelam's admirer 
 Mohammed Adil as Humza Shah Abdalli – Razia and Junaid's son; Saltanat, Kaynaat and Zaroon's cousin; Neelam's brother; Kaynaat's ex-fiancé
 S Ashraf Karim as Junaid "Jaan" Shah Abdalli – Razia's widower; Miajaan's son-in-law; Neelam and Humza's father; Kaynaat, Saltanat and Zaroon's uncle

Production

Development
Before its premiere, it was titled as Sufiyana Ishq but was later changed to Sufiyana Pyaar Mera.
It was reported to air on Star Plus but was later shifted to Star Bharat.

Filming
Set in Delhi, the series was mainly filmed in Mumbai while some initial sequences were shot at some streets and monuments of Delhi like Humayun’s Tomb, Qutub Minar, Ring Road and Safdarjung Railway Station.

Awards

References

2019 Indian television series debuts
Star Bharat original programming
Indian drama television series